This article refers to Raven Cliff Falls in South Carolina; for the Georgia falls, see Raven Cliff Falls (Georgia).

Raven Cliff Falls on Matthews Creek in Caesars Head State Park, Greenville County, South Carolina, is the tallest waterfall in South Carolina.  Although the waterfall is described as having a 400 foot drop, topographic maps suggest a height between 320 and 350 feet.

External links
 Description and photos of falls from SCwaterfalls website
 Profile on GORP
 Description and photos of falls
 Raven Cliff Falls Historical Marker

Waterfalls of South Carolina
Protected areas of Greenville County, South Carolina
Landforms of Greenville County, South Carolina